Tritoniopsis is a genus of flowering plants in the family Iridaceae, first described as a genus in 1926. The entire genus is endemic to Cape Province in South Africa. The genus name refers to the African genus Tritonia and is combined with the Greek word opsis, meaning "look-alike".

 Species

References

Iridaceae
Iridaceae genera
Endemic flora of South Africa
Taxa named by Louisa Bolus